Baykal-Energiya is a bandy club from Irkutsk, Russia. The team plays in the Russian Bandy Super League, the highest level of Russian bandy.

It was founded in 1923 changing its name several times before becoming Lokomotiv Irkutsk in 1947. Lokomotiv played in the top division of the Soviet bandy championship since 1960. Since 1992 it changed its sponsorship and was renamed as Sibskana Irkutsk. In 2002 the club changed its name once again to Sibskana-Energiya Irkutsk and finally got its current name in 2004.

In the last game of the regular 2016–17 Russian Bandy Super League season Baykal-Energiya played against Vodnik Arkhangelsk. The loss apparently would make Vodnik facing a weaker team in the playoffs, therefore the team started to score own goals. Baykal-Energiya joined, apparently for fun. Vodnik won 11-9, with all goals scored in the game being own goals. The two teams are facing sanctions from the Russian Bandy Federation. The Federation banned coach Igor Gapanovich of Vodnik Arkhangelsk and coach Evgeny Erakhtin of Baykal-Energiya each for 30 months in March 2017, and fined each club 300,000 rubles (£4,100/$5,100/€4,800) for the teams scoring an aggregate of 20 goals in their own nets rather than their opponent’s to ensure they played against a convenient team in upcoming play-offs.

Baykal-Energiya-2
Baykal-Energiya's second team Baykal-Energiya-2 plays in the Russian Bandy Supreme League, the second tier of Russian bandy.

References

External links
Official website

Bandy clubs in Russia
Bandy clubs in the Soviet Union
Sport in Irkutsk
Bandy clubs established in 1923
1923 establishments in Russia